Amore is the eleventh studio album by Italian tenor Andrea Bocelli, released on 31 January 2006, for the Valentine's Day season. This album features a remake of Elvis Presley's "Can't Help Falling in Love"; "Because We Believe", the closing song of the 2006 Winter Olympics in Turin, Italy, which Bocelli wrote and performed; "Somos Novios (It's Impossible), a duet with American pop singer Christina Aguilera; and his first recording of Bésame Mucho, which eventually became one of his signature songs.

Releases

Amore was released internationally beginning on 28 February 2006.

A Spanish version of the album was also released in the same year, called Amor.

Track listing

For Amore 
 "Amapola" – 3:43
 "Besame Mucho" – 4:01
 "Les Feuilles Mortes (Autumn Leaves)" – 4:49
 "Mi Manchi" (feat. Kenny G) – 3:35
 "Somos Novios (It's Impossible)" (feat. Christina Aguilera) – 4:22
 "Solamente Una Vez" – 3:29
 "Jurame" – 3:22
 "Pero te Extraño" – 4:06
 "Canzoni Stonate" (feat. Stevie Wonder) – 5:17 
 "L'Appuntamento (Sentado à Beira do Caminho)" – 4:08
 "Cuando Me Enamoro (Quando m'innamoro)" – 3:56
 "Can't Help Falling in Love" – 3:25
 "Because We Believe" – 4:37
 "Ama Credi e Vai (Because We Believe)" – 4:41

 Japan bonus track
  "Somos Novios (It's Impossible)" (feat. Rimi Natsukawa)

For Amor, the Spanish version of the album 
 "Besame Mucho"
 "Cancion Desafinada" (Spanish version of Canzoni Stonate with Stevie Wonder)
 "Solamente Una Vez" (Original version in Spanish of You Belong To My Heart)
 "Somos Novios (It's Impossible)" (with Christina Aguilera)
 "Jurame" (with Mario Reyes) – 3:22
 "Pero te Extraño"
 "Las Hojas Muertas" (Spanish version of Autumn Leaves)
 "Momentos"
 "Me Faltas "Mi Manchi" (with Kenny G)
 "Cuando Me Enamoro" (Spanish version of Quando m'innamoro)
 "Porque Tu Me Acostumbraste"
 "Amapola"
 Verano Estate (with Chris Botti)
 "Nuestro Encuentro" (Spanish version of L'Appuntamento)

Commercial Performance
With 113,000 units sold in its first week of release, Amore debuted at No. 3 on the Billboard 200 chart, which at the time was Bocelli's highest chart position in America yet, only to be surpassed by his 2009 release My Christmas, which reached No. 2. It went on to sell 1.66 million copies in the United States and was certified Platinum by the RIAA. Bocelli was the seventh best-selling artist of 2006, in the United States, with  2,524,681 copies of his albums sold that year. The Spanish version, Amor, was also certified Album Multi-Platino (Double Platinum) by the RIAA. Both versions were also certified Gold and Platinum in several other counties.

Charts

Weekly charts

Year-end charts

Certifications and sales

Personnel 
Veronica Berti: Vocals on "Les Feuilles Mortes (Autumn Leaves)"
Kenny G: Saxophone on "Mi Manchi"
Christina Aguilera: Vocals on "Somos Novios (It's Impossible)"
Marco Borsato: Vocals on "Because We Believe"
Mario Reyes: Flamenco guitar on "Jurame"
Stevie Wonder: Harmonica and additional vocals on "Canzoni Stonate"
David Foster and Randy Waldman: Acoustic piano and keyboards
Nathan East: Bass
Vinnie Colaiuta: Drums
Dean Parks, Ramon Stagnaro, Michael Thompson, and Michael Landau: Guitars
Paulinho Da Costa and Rafael Padilla: Percussion
Dan Higgins: Flute
David Foster: Arrangement
Jorge Calandrelli and David Foster: Arrangement on " Amapola"
Humberto Gatica, Chartmaker Studios: Mixing
Hernan Gatica, Pierpaolo Guerinni, Valerio Calisse, Jochem van der Saag, and Alejando Rodriguez: Recording
Neil Devor and Chris Brooke: Additional engineering
Oscar Ramirez: Additional Pro-Tools engineering on "Somos Novios (It's Impossible)"
Jochem van der Saag: Programming and sound design

See also
 Under the Desert Sky the CD/DVD package of a pop concert for the album

References

External links
 Amore charts

2006 albums
Albums produced by Humberto Gatica
Albums produced by David Foster
Andrea Bocelli albums
Decca Records albums